Naocha Singh Huidrom (born 24 August 1999) an Indian professional footballer who plays as a defender for I-League club RoundGlass Punjab, on loan from Indian Super League club Mumbai City.

Career

TRAU
In 2017, he shifted his base from NEROCA to TRAU, who were playing in the second division league.

Gokulam Kerala
On 6 August 2019, it was announced that Singh signed for Gokulam Kerala in the I-League.

Career statistics

Club

Honours

Club
Gokulam Kerala

 Durand Cup: 2019
 I-League: 2020–21

References

External links

Living people
1999 births
Footballers from Manipur
Indian footballers
Association football defenders
Gokulam Kerala FC players
NEROCA FC players
TRAU FC players
I-League players